Global Research may refer to:

Global Research Alliance, a New Delhi organization promoting the Millennium Development Goals through R&D
GE Global Research, R&D division of General Electric
Global Research Council, an organization facilitating national science funding agencies' conferences
Globalresearch.ca, a conspiracy website operated by Michel Chossudovsky's Centre for Research on Globalization